Posey County Courthouse Square is a historic courthouse located at Mount Vernon, Posey County, Indiana.  The courthouse was built between 1874 and 1876, and is a red brick building consisting of a central rectangular mass flanked by two projecting gabled pavilions.  It predominantly reflects the Italianate style of architecture with arched windows and brackets.  It has Second Empire influences in the segmental pediments and mansard roof of the lantern that tops the domed roof.  Also on the property is the contributing Posey County Soldier's and Sailor's Monument (1908).

It was listed on the National Register of Historic Places in 1989.

References

Mount Vernon, Indiana
County courthouses in Indiana
Courthouses on the National Register of Historic Places in Indiana
Second Empire architecture in Indiana
Italianate architecture in Indiana
Buildings and structures in Posey County, Indiana
National Register of Historic Places in Posey County, Indiana